Lists of film series may refer to:

 Lists of feature film series
 List of short film series
 List of animated short film series